Fabienne Égal (born 21 July 1954 in Rabat, Morocco) is a French announcer and television host.

Career
She became an announcer on TF1 in the 1970s, then hosted Les pieds au mur with Nicolas Hulot in 1980 and La Une chez vous (1985-1987). She became famous presenting TV show Tournez manège from 1985 to 1993, alongside Evelyne Leclercq and Simone Garnier. When the show was no longer broadcast, she hosted Double mixte and Doublé gagnant on RTL 9, then Jeux sans frontières with Nelson Monfort on France 2. She also participated as a guest star in the TV series Pas de pitié pour les croissants !  She started working as a television announcer on TF1 in 1976, after answering a classified ad in Télé 7 Jours and being selected from among 2,600 candidates.

TV shows
 Les pieds au mur, 1980
 La Une chez vous, 1985-1987
 Tournez manège, 1985-1993
 Double mixte and Doublé gagnant, RTL 9
 Jeux sans frontières, 1999

References

External links

1954 births
French television presenters
French women television presenters
People from Rabat
Living people